Danakil may refer to:

Danakil people or Afar people, an ethnic group in the Horn of Africa
Danakil Depression, a desert basin in north-eastern Ethiopia and southern Eritrea
Danakil Desert, a desert in the Horn of Africa
Danakil Depression or Afar Triangle, a geological depression in the Horn of Africa
Danakil Alps, a mountain range in the Horn of Africa
Danakil Isthmus, a land bridge across the Bab-el-Mandeb strait during the Miocene epoch
Danakil mine, a mine in the northern Afar Region of Ethiopia
Danakil desert lark, a subspecies of Desert lark
Danakilia, a genus of fish native to northeastern Africa
Danakil (band), a French reggae band
Danakil, the pseudonym of the French photographer and videographer Cyrille de Vignemont (on French Wikipédia)

Language and nationality disambiguation pages